was a Japanese noble, statesman, general, and poet of the early Heian period. A member of the Hokke, he was the second son of the udaijin Fujiwara no Uchimaro.

Life 
In the court of Emperor Kanmu, Fuyutsugu held posts as chief judge and then as a captain in the imperial guard.

In 811 he was promoted to sangi, thus joining the kugyō. In 819, he was appointed dainagon, making him the head of the cabinet. With this Fuyutsugu finally surpassed Fujiwara no Otsugu of the Shikike, one year his senior, who had found great success under Emperor Kanmu and made sangi ten years before Fuyutsugu did. In 821, Fuyutsugu was promoted to udaijin.

In the court of Saga's successor Emperor Junna, Kanmu's son, Otsugu was promoted to udaijin in 825, pushing Fuyutsugu to sadaijin. When his grandson Emperor Montoku ascended to the throne in 850, he granted Fuyutsugu the additional posthumous rank of daijō-daijin.

Personality 

According to the Nihon Kōki, Fuyutsugu was talented and magnanimous, gentle and calm. Able in both literary and military arts, he had a flexible viewpoint, and his generous attitude with others brought him favor. He also made charitable donations to the poor from his wages.

Aside from his political activities, Fuyutsugu strove to unite the Fujiwara clan with himself as its head. He built  as a dormitory for young Fujiwara students, constructed the South Octagonal Hall at Kōfuku-ji, and made a large donation to the free pharmacy built by Empress Kōmyō.

Fuyutsugu contributed to the editing of several works, including the Nihon Kōki. His kanshi poems are included in the Ryōunshū, Bunka Shūreishū, and Keikokushū, and the Gosen Wakashū contains four of his waka.

Genealogy 
Father: Fujiwara no Uchimaro
Mother: , daughter of 
Wife: , daughter of 
Son: 
Son: 
Son: 
Daughter: , court lady of Emperor Ninmyō, mother of Emperor Montoku
Wife: daughter of Kudara no Konikishi no Jintei
Son: 
Wife: daughter of 
Son: 
Son: , ancestor of the Kajūji branch of the Fujiwara
Wife: daughter of 
Son: 
Wife: daughter of 
Son: 
Wife: unknown
Daughter: , court lady of Emperor Montoku

References 

Fujiwara clan
775 births
826 deaths
People of Heian-period Japan